Karl Gerland (14 July 1905 – 21 April 1945) was a Nazi Gauleiter of Gau Kurhessen and Oberpräsident of the Prussian Province of Kurhessen. On 21 April 1945, Gerland was killed in action against the Soviet Red Army at Frankfurt (Oder).

Early years 
Gerland was born in Gottsbüren (now a part of Trendelburg) near Kassel. He graduated from the gymnasium in Kassel in 1923 and then was employed as a mechanical engineer by the German National Railway. He pursued additional training in engineering at the University of Hanover until 1928 and then worked in various commercial and technical businesses.

Nazi career
Gerland joined the Nazi Party in December 1929 and became  Kreisleiter (County Leader) in Kreis Hofgeismar from September 1930 to January 1932. From January to July 1932, he was Beziksleiter (District Leader) in Fulda-Gersfeld-Hünfeld and Deputy Propaganda Leader of Gau Hesse-Nassau North. In July 1932, he advanced to Gau Propaganda Leader. After the Nazi seizure of power, he became head of the provincial office of the Reich Ministry of Propaganda from May to November 1934. He then worked as a department head in the office of Deputy Führer Rudolf Hess in the Party Reichsleitung (National Leadership) in Munich from November 1934 to November 1938. In March 1936, Gerland was elected to the Reichstag from electoral constituency 8, (Liegnitz). On 30 January 1938, he was awarded the Golden Party Badge. Gerland joined the SS on 16 March 1938 with the rank of Hauptsturmführer. From 1 June 1938 until 6 November 1943, he was Deputy Gauleiter in Reichsgau Lower Danube.

The war years
From May to September 1940, Gerland saw military service as an Unteroffizier of Reserves, and was wounded in the battle of France. On 9 November 1940, he was promoted to SS-Oberführer and assigned to the staff of the Reichsführer-SS. In November 1943, Gerland was promoted to SS-Brigadeführer and, on 6 November, he was appointed Gauleiter and Reich Defense Commissioner in Gau Kurhessen. He succeeded Karl Weinrich, who had been removed from these posts for abandoning the city of Kassel during an air raid on 22 October. Gerland served as acting Gauleiter from 6 November 1943 until being named permanent on 13 December 1944. From 1 July 1944 Gerland was also Oberpräsident (High President) of the newly formed Prussian Province of Kurhessen, which formerly had  been part of the Province of Hesse-Nassau. Gerland thus united under his control the highest party and governmental offices in the province. On 1 August 1944 Gerland was promoted to SS-Gruppenführer.
 
In the spring of 1945, with the American Army invading his Gau, he received high praise from Joseph Goebbels. In his diary entry of 2 April 1945, Goebbels noted that Gerland was conducting himself "superbly," adding, "I would have expected this from [him] anyway." When his capital, Kassel, fell to American forces on 4 April 1945, Gerland fled eastward and joined German forces fighting in Brandenburg. On 21 April, Gerland was killed near Frankfurt (Oder) during fighting on the Eastern Front.

References

Sources

External website
 

1905 births
1945 deaths
Gauleiters
Members of the Reichstag of Nazi Germany
Nazi Party officials
Nazi Party politicians
Nazi propagandists
People from Hesse-Nassau
People from Kassel (district)
SS-Gruppenführer